Robert Avery "Lefty" Barnes (January 6, 1902 – December 8, 1993) was a Major League Baseball pitcher who played in two games for the Chicago White Sox in .

External links

1902 births
1993 deaths
Illinois Fighting Illini baseball players
Major League Baseball pitchers
Baseball players from Illinois
Chicago White Sox players
People from Washburn, Illinois